Xaya Iccita is the Yakut god of mountains.

Turkic deities
Siberian deities
Yakut mythology

Mountain deities